The Baynard Boulevard Historic District is a national historic district located at Wilmington, New Castle County, Delaware. It encompasses 77 contributing buildings with examples of Colonial Revival, Tudor Revival, and Queen Anne architecture.  The area developed after being laid out in 1893, and is a prime example of a turn-of-the-20th-century American suburb, or "streetcar suburb."  The dwellings date between 1895 and 1930.  The district is predominantly residential.  Also located in the district is the McCabe United Methodist Church, Beth Shalom Synagogue, Hanover Presbyterian Church, and No. 30 School.

It was added to the National Register of Historic Places in 1979.

Education
It is in the Red Clay Consolidated School District. It is zoned to Evan G. Shortlidge Academy (Kindergarten-Grade 2), Emalea P. Warner Elementary School (grades 2–5), Skyline Middle School (6–8), and John Dickinson School (9–12).

References

American middle class
Queen Anne architecture in Delaware
Colonial Revival architecture in Delaware
Tudor Revival architecture in Delaware
Historic districts in Wilmington, Delaware
Historic districts on the National Register of Historic Places in Delaware
National Register of Historic Places in Wilmington, Delaware